ROIC may refer to:

 Return on capital
 Readout integrated circuit